Luis Domingo Aguirre Barreyro (20 December 1911 – date of death unknown) was an Argentine sailor. He competed in the 1936 Summer Olympics.

References

1911 births
Sailors at the 1936 Summer Olympics – 8 Metre
Argentine male sailors (sport)
Olympic sailors of Argentina
Sportspeople from Buenos Aires
Year of death missing